Lateral nucleus may refer to:
 Lateral hypothalamus
 Lateral vestibular nucleus